Foreign policy of Herbert Hoover covers the international activities and policies of Herbert Hoover for his entire career, with emphasis to his roles from 1914 to 1933.

World War I
World War I broke out in August 1914, pitting Germany and its allies against France and Britain and their allies.  The US was neutral, and about 125,000 American tourists and visitors were trapped in Europe and needed to get home immediately. The transatlantic passenger ships were temporarily cancelled, and banks were closed so they were short of money. They flooded the American embassies especially in London.  Hoover volunteered and soon took charge of operations in London in cooperation with other London-based American businessmen and the US ambassador. Hoover raised money locally until gold appropriated by Congress arrived. His team helped tens of thousands with loans and travel assistance. He finished his emergency role by October.

Belgium and occupied France 1914–1917

Food Administrator in US 1917–1918

Post-war relief in Europe

American relief and Russian famine of 1921
Under Hoover's direction, very large scale food relief was distributed to Europe after the war though the American Relief Administration. In 1921, to ease famine in Russia, the ARA's director in Europe, Walter Lyman Brown,  began negotiated an agreement with Soviet People's Commissar for Foreign Affairs, Maxim Litvinov in August, 1921; an additional implementation agreement was signed by Brown and People's Commissar for Foreign Trade Leonid Krasin on December 30, 1921. The U.S. Congress appropriated $20,000,000 for relief under the Russian Famine Relief Act of late 1921. At its peak, the ARA employed 300 Americans, more than 120,000 Russians and fed 10.5 million people daily. Its Russian operations were headed by Col. William N. Haskell. The Medical Division of the ARA functioned from November 1921 to June 1923 and helped overcome the typhus epidemic then ravaging Russia.  Hoover strongly detested Bolshevism, and felt the American aid would demonstrate the superiority of Western capitalism and thus help contain the spread of communism.

The ARA's operations in Russia were shut down on June 15, 1923, after it was discovered that Russia renewed the export of grain.

Secretary of Commerce, 1921-1928

President, 1929–1933
In his Memoirs Hoover recalled his main efforts to promote peace:
 Ending intervention policy in Latin America. 
 Advocated adherence to the world court with reservations.
 Negotiated treaties calling for arbitration and conciliation.
 Expanded the Kellogg-Briand peace pact.
 Cooperated with the League of Nations and activities that did not involve force.
 Reduced naval competition with Great Britain.
 Ended British expansion of its naval and air bases in the Western hemisphere.
 Worked to sustain democratic government in Germany.
 Worked with other nations to restrain Japanese aggression in China. Although he did use military force to protect American interests in China.
 Worked a limit the international naval arms race.
 In 1931 imposed a moratorium on intergovernmental debts to reduce the impact of the Great Depression

Disarmament
Hoover placed a priority on disarmament, which he hoped would allow the United States to shift money from the military to domestic needs. Hoover and his Secretary of State Henry L. Stimson focused on extending the 1922 Washington Naval Treaty, which sought to prevent a naval arms race. As a result of Hoover's efforts, the United States and other major naval powers signed the 1930 London Naval Treaty. The treaty represented the first time that the naval powers had agreed to cap their tonnage of auxiliary vessels, as previous agreements had only affected capital ships.

Hoover's Chief of Naval Operations William V. Pratt (1930-1933) agreed with Hoovers's emphasis on disarmament and went along with postponement of new construction and cutting the fleet.  Other naval officers disagreed sharply with Hoover's policies.

At the 1932 World Disarmament Conference, Hoover urged further cutbacks in armaments and the outlawing of tanks and bombers, but his proposals were not adopted.

China
In 1931, Japan invaded Manchuria, defeating the Republic of China's National Revolutionary Army and establishing Manchukuo, a puppet state. The Hoover administration deplored the invasion, but also sought to avoid antagonizing the Japanese, fearing that taking too strong a stand would weaken the moderate forces in the Japanese government and alienate a potential ally against the Soviet Union, which he saw as a much greater threat. In response to the Japanese invasion, Hoover and Secretary of State Stimson outlined the Stimson Doctrine, which held that the United States would not recognize territories gained by force.

Trade decline: Higher tariff and hostile retaliation

The Tariff Act of 1930, commonly known as the Smoot–Hawley Tariff,  implemented protectionist trade policies, was signed by President Hoover on June 17, 1930. The act raised US tariffs on over 20,000 imported goods.  The new law and tariffs imposed by America's trading partners in retaliation were major factors of the reduction of American exports and imports by 67% during the Depression.  Most of the decline was due to a plunge in GDP in the US and worldwide. However beyond that was additional decline. Some countries protested and others also retaliated with trade restrictions and tariffs. American exports to the protesters fell 18% and exports to those who retaliated fell 31%.  Economists and economic historians have a consensus view that the Smoot–Hawley Tariff worsened the effects of the Great Depression.

Latin America

According to William Leuchtenburg,  during Hoover's term, the world order established in the immediate aftermath of World War I began to crumble. As president, Hoover largely made good on his pledge made prior to assuming office not to interfere in Latin America's internal affairs. In 1930, he released the Clark Memorandum, a rejection of the Roosevelt Corollary and a move towards non-interventionism in Latin America. Hoover did not completely refrain from the use of the military in Latin American affairs; he thrice threatened intervention in the Dominican Republic, and he sent warships to El Salvador to support the government against a left-wing revolution. Notwithstanding those actions, he wound down the Banana Wars, ending the occupation of Nicaragua and nearly bringing an end to the occupation of Haiti.

The Roosevelt Corollary, articulated by President Theodore Roosevelt in 1904, states that the United States could intervene in the internal affairs of Latin American countries if they committed flagrant and chronic financial wrongdoings.  The U.S. took over the police role to stop interventions by European powers. Hoover in 1930 endorsed the Clark Memorandum that repudiated the Roosevelt Corollary in favor of what was later called the Good Neighbor policy.

Haiti and Nicaragua

Hoover appointed William Cameron Forbes to lead a commission to Haiti in 1930. Forbes gave Hoover a plan to stabilize Haiti and remove the Marines. An agreement in August 1931 started the withdrawal and a similar plan led to Hoover's withdrawal of troops from Nicaragua. Franklin Roosevelt later completed the process, calling it the "Good Neighbor policy." It ended three decades of intervention, but ignored the rise of dictators.

Debt moratorium of 1931

The Hoover Moratorium was a public statement issued by Hoover on June 20, 1931, who hoped to ease the coming international economic crisis. It provided a one-year delay  ("moratorium") on payments of  German and inter-Allied war debt stemming from World War I. The proposal would postpone the repayment of both capital and interest.  Many, both in the United States and abroad, were outraged by this idea.  The statement was met with initial disapproval from France and many American citizens, but, after much telephonic lobbying by Hoover, went on to gain support from 15 nations by July 6. It was approved by the United States Congress in December. In 1932 the resumption of payments did not happen. The debts were finally consolidated and paid off in 1953 by the London Agreement on German External Debts.

Ex-president 1933–1964

World War II

Late 1940s
After being frozen out by Roosevelt, Hoover was delighted that his offer of help to the new President Harry S Truman was quickly accepted.<ref>Benjamin F. Rogers, "Dear Mr. President': The Hoover-Truman Correspondence." Presidential Studies Quarterly 16.3 (1986): 503-510. </ref> They became friends and Hoover took on the role as chief advisor regarding food relief and other help to impoverished Europe. 

1950s 

When the Korean war broke out in 1950, Hoover first gave his friend Truman public support. But late in the year, as Chinese intervention pushed the American, South Korean and UN forces back to the South, Hoover made a major address that called for a new strategy. His repeated his frequent warning that the massive manpower advantage of the communist states, now including China, made a land made land warfare a losing proposition for America and its allies. Instead it was necessary to relate rely on technological superiority and airpower and seapower. For East Asia, Hoover recommended a different defensive alliance that included Japan, Formosa, and the Philippines, but did not include South Korea. By minimizing reliance on Army land forces, it was a cost-saving procedure. He recommends a Japan being encouraged to build up its forces as well. Hoover's position was widely adopted by formerly isolationist Republicans like Sen. Robert Taft, and criticized by the internationalist-oriented Republicans such as John Foster Dulles.  Dwight D. Eisenhower agreed with Hoover's deemphasis on expensive ground armies and followed through in implementing that policy after his election in 1952.

See also
 History of U.S. foreign policy, 1913–1933
 Foreign policy of the Woodrow Wilson administration
 International relations (1919–1939)
 History of China–United States relations to 1948
 Latin America–United States relations
 United Kingdom–United States relations
 Hoover Institution Library and Archive

Notes

Further reading

Biographies
 Best, Gary Dean. Life of Herbert Hoover : Keeper of the Torch, 1933-1964 (2013).
 Burner, David. Herbert HooverL A Public Life (1979).
 Clements, Kendrick A. The Life of Herbert Hoover: Imperfect Visionary, 1918-1928 (2010)
 Jeansonne, Glen. Herbert Hoover: A Life (2016), long scholarly biography excerpt
 Jeansonne, Glen. The Life of Herbert Hoover: Fighting Quaker, 1928-1933 (Palgrave Macmillan, 2012). excerpt
 Leuchtenburg, William E. Herbert Hoover (2009). online 
 Morison, Elting E. Turmoil and Tradition: A Study of the Life and Times of Henry L. Stimson  (1960) online
 Nash, George H. "The 'Great Humanitarian': Herbert Hoover, the Relief of Belgium, and the Reconstruction of Europe after War I." The Tocqueville Review 38.2 (2017): 55–70.
 Nash, George H. "An American Epic’: Herbert Hoover and Belgian Relief in World War I." Prologue Magazine 21 (1989). online
 Nash, George H. The Life of Herbert Hoover: The Engineer 1874–1914 (1983) vol 1. online. 
 Nash, George H. The Humanitarian, 1914–1917, The Life of Herbert Hoover, 2. (1988) 
 Nash, George H. Master of Emergencies, 1917–1918, The Life of Herbert Hoover, 3. (1996) online
 Smith, Richard Norton. An Uncommon Man: The Triumph of Herbert Hoover (1984), focus on post-presidency
 Stimson, Henry L. and McGeorge Bundy. On Active Services in Peace and War (1948) online
 Wilson, Joan Hoff. Herbert Hoover: forgotten progressive (1975) pp 168–208.

Scholarly studies
 Accinelli, Robert D. "The Hoover Administration and the World Court." Peace & Change 4.3 (1977): 28–36.
 Banholzer, Simon, and Tobias Straumann. "Why the French Said 'Non': A New Perspective on the Hoover Moratorium of June 1931." Journal of Contemporary History 56.4 (2021): 1040–1060. doi:10.1177/0022009420949924
 Braeman, John. "Power and Diplomacy: the 1920's Reappraised." The Review of Politics 44.3 (1982): 342–369.
 Brandes, Joseph. Herbert Hoover and economic diplomacy; Department of Commerce policy 1921-1928 (1962) online borrow
 Burk, Kathleen. "The Lineaments of Foreign Policy: The United States and a 'New World Order,' 1919–39." Journal of American Studies 26.3 (1992): 377–391. 
 Cabanes, Bruno. "The hungry and the sick: Herbert Hoover, the Russian famine, and the professionalization of humanitarian aid" in Bruno Cabanes, The Great War and the Origins of Humanitarianism, 1918-1924 (Cambridge UP, 2014) 189–247. 
 Chapman, Michael E. "Ironies of Character: Hoover's Foreign Policy with Asia." in A Companion to Warren G. Harding, Calvin Coolidge, and Herbert Hoover (2014): 502–521.
 Costigliola, Frank. Awkward dominion: American political, economic, and cultural relations with Europe, 1919-1933 (Cornell UP, 1984).
 Current, Richard N. "The Stimson Doctrine and the Hoover Doctrine." American Historical Review 59.3 (1954): 513–542. online
 DeConde, Alexander. Herbert Hoover's Latin-American policy (1951) online
 DeConde, Alexander, ed. Encyclopedia of American Foreign Policy: Studies of the Principal Movements and Ideas (4 vol 1979)
 DeConde, Alexander.  A History of American Foreign Policy (1963), textbook.
 Doenecke, Justus D. "The Anti-Interventionism of Herbert Hoover." Journal of Libertarian Studies 8.2 (1987): 311–340. online
 Doenecke, Justus D. Not to the Swift: The Old Isolationists in the Cold War Era (1979)

 Dozer, Donald. Good Neighbors? Three Decades of Inter-American Relations, 1930-1960 (1959)
 Druelle, Clotilde.  Feeding Occupied France during World War I: Herbert Hoover and the Blockade (2019) 
 Ellis, L. Ethan. Republican Foreign Policy, 1921-1933 (1968) online
 Fausold, Martin L. The Presidency of Herbert C. Hoover (UP of Kansas, 1985), aa major scholarly survey online
 Ferrell, Robert H. American Diplomacy in the Great Depression: Hoover–Stimson Foreign Policy, 1929–1933 (1957). 
 Gelfand, Lawrence E. ed. Herbert Hoover--the Great War and Its Aftermath, 1914-23 (U of Iowa Press, 1979). Eight essays by scholars. online

 George Jr, James H. "Another Chance: Herbert Hoover and World War II Relief." Diplomatic History 16.3 (1992): 389–407. online
 Herring, George C. From colony to superpower: US foreign relations since 1776 (Oxford University Press, 2008), textbook.
 Jeansonne, Glen S. "Hoover goes to Belgium." History Today (Jan 2015) 65#1 pp 19–24. online; popular history
 Kennedy, Greg. "Depression and security: Aspects influencing the United States Navy during the Hoover administration." Diplomacy and Statecraft 6.2 (1995): 342–372.

 Koyoma, Kumiko. 2009. “The Passage of the Smoot-Hawley Tariff Act: Why Did the President Sign the Bill?” Journal of Policy History 21 (2): 163-86
 Kubo, Fumiaki, Ryūji Hattori, and Satoshi Hattori. "The 1930s: Japan’s War with China and American Non-Recognition." in The History of US-Japan Relations (Palgrave Macmillan, Singapore, 2017). 83–102. online

 Lippmann, Walter. The United States in world affairs: An account of American foreign relations: 1931 (Harper, 1932).
 Lippmann, Walter. The United States in world affairs: An account of American foreign relations: 1932 (Harper, 1933).
 Lochner, Louis P. Herbert Hoover and Germany (1960) online
 McKercher, B. J. C. "'A Certain Irritation': The White House, the State Department, and the Desire for a Naval Settlement with Great Britain, 1927–1930." Diplomatic History 31.5 (2007): 829–863. online
 McKercher, B. J. C. "Chrysalis Of Power: Us Foreign Policy And The Retreat From Isolationism, 1919–1941." in A Companion to US Foreign Relations: Colonial Era to the Present (2020) pp: 345–381.
 McPherson, Alan. "Herbert Hoover, Occupation Withdrawal, and the Good Neighbor Policy." Presidential Studies Quarterly  44.4 (2014): 623–639 online
 Maddox, Robert James. William E. Borah and American Foreign Policy: 1907-1929 (1964).
 Myers, William Starr; Walter H. Newton, eds. The Hoover Administration; a documented narrative (1936) pp 577–618.online many documents included in the narrative.
 Nash, Lee, ed. Understanding Herbert Hoover: Ten Perspectives (1987); essays by scholars on various topics. online
 Parafianowicz, Halina. "Hoover's Moratorium and Some Aspects of American Policy Towards Eastern and Central Europe in 1931," American Studies. (1987) 6#1 pp 63–84.
 Parrini, Carl P. Heir to empire: United States economic diplomacy, 1916-1923 (1969) online
 Pemberton, Jo-Anne. "The Hoover Plan, Reparations and the French Constructive Plan." in Pemberton, The Story of International Relations, Part Two (Palgrave Macmillan, Cham, 2019) pp. 185–277. On war debts owed to US.

 Rappaport, Armin. Henry L. Stimson and Japan, 1931-33 (1963)
 Robinson, Edgar Eugene, and Vaughn Davis Bornet. Herbert Hoover: President of the United States (1975). 398 pp; a weak defense of Hoover's policies
 Rogers, Benjamin F. “‘Dear Mr. President’: The Hoover-Truman Correspondence.” Presidential Studies Quarterly 16#3  (1986), pp. 503–10, online
 Thorne, Christopher. The Limits of Foreign Policy: The West, the League and the Far Eastern Crisis of 1931–1933 (1972)
 Van Meer, Elisabeth. "The Transatlantic Pursuit of a World Engineering Federation" Technology & Culture (2012) 53#1 pp 120–145. online
 Walker III, William O. "Crucible for peace: Herbert Hoover, modernization, and economic growth in Latin America." Diplomatic History 30.1 (2006): 83–117. online jstor
 Webster, Andrew. Strange Allies: Britain, France and the Dilemmas of Disarmament and Security, 1929–1933 (Routledge, 2019).
 Weissman, Benjamin M. Herbert Hoover and famine relief to Soviet Russia, 1921–1923 (Hoover Institution Press, 1974).
 Wheeler, Gerald E. "Republican Philippine Policy, 1921-1933." Pacific Historical Review 28.4 (1959): 377–390. online jstor
 Wilson, Joan Hoff. American Business and Foreign Policy: 1920–1933 (University Press of Kentucky, 1971).
 Wilson, John R. M. “Herbert Hoover’s Military Policy.” in Herbert Hoover and World Peace, ed. Lee Nash. (2010) pp 115–32.
 Wilson, John R. M.  “The Quaker and the Sword: Herbert Hoover’s Relations with the Military.” Military Affairs 38#2 (1974), pp. 41–47, online.
 Wynn, Neil A. Historical dictionary from the great war to the great depression (Scarecrow Press, 2013). online

Historiography
 Doenecke, Justus D. "Historians' Views of the Republican Era: Was Roosevelt an Entirely New Turn?" in A Companion to Warren G. Harding, Calvin Coolidge, and Herbert Hoover (2014): 543–565.
 Goodall, Alex. "U.S. Foreign Relations under Harding, Coolidge, and Hoover: Power and Constraint." in A Companion to Warren G. Harding, Calvin Coolidge, and Herbert Hoover (2014): 53–76.
 Hatfield, Mark, ed. Herbert Hoover Reassessed: Essays Commemorating the Fiftieth Anniversary of the Inauguration of Our Thirty-First President (US Government Printing Office,  1981).  online free, major collection of 29 essays by scholars; 8 deal with foreign policy, pp 313–448.
 Hawley, Ellis. "Herbert Hoover and the Historians—Recent Developments: A Review Essay" Annals of Iowa 78#1 (2018) p. 75-86 https://doi.org/10.17077/0003-4827.12547
 Hogan, Michael J. ed.  Paths to Power: The Historiography of American Foreign Relations to 1941 (Cambridge UP, 2000).

 Kahan, Paul. "Herbert Hoover's Diplomacy Toward Latin America." in A Companion to Warren G. Harding, Calvin Coolidge, and Herbert Hoover (2014) pp: 484–501.

Primary sources
 Hoover, Herbert. An American Epic: Introduction: The Relief of Belgium and Northern France, 1914-1930 (1959) online also  online review
 Hoover, Herbert. An American epic. 2, Famine in forty five nations : organization behind the front 1914-1923 (1960) online
 Hoover, Herbert. An American epic. 3, Famine in forty-five nations. The battle on the front line 1914-1923 (1961) 
 Hoover, Herbert. Memoirs volume 1: Years of Adventure 1874-1920 (1952) online
 Hoover, Herbert. Memoirs volume 2: The Cabinet and the Presidency, 1920–1933 (1952) online
 Hoover, Herbert. Memoirs volume 3: The Great Depression, 1929–1941 (1952) online
 Hawley, Ellis, ed. Herbert Hoover: Containing the Public Messages, Speeches, and Statements of the President, (4 vols. 1974–1977). 
 Myers, William Starr; Walter H. Newton, eds. The Hoover Administration; a documented narrative''. (1936) online many documents included in the narrative.

External links
  Saladin Ambar, "Woodrow Wilson:  Foreign Affairs" (Miller Center, 2021)
 Eugene P. Trani, "Warren Harding: Foreign Affairs" (Miller Center, 2021)
   David Greenberg, "Calvin Coolidge: Foreign Affairs" (Miller Center, 2021)
 David E. Hamilton, "Herbert Hoover: Foreign Affairs" (Miller Center, 2021)

1929 establishments in the United States
1933 disestablishments in the United States
History of the foreign relations of the United States
Presidency of Herbert Hoover
Aftermath of World War I in the United States